Division No. 2, Newfoundland and Labrador is a census division in the Canadian province of Newfoundland and Labrador, primarily comprising the Burin Peninsula. Like all census divisions in Newfoundland and Labrador, but unlike the census divisions of some other provinces, the division exists only as a statistical division for census data, and is not a political entity.

In the Canada 2016 Census, the division had a population of 20,372 (down from 21,351 in 2011) and a land area of 6,099.08 square kilometres.

Towns

Unorganized subdivisions

Subdivision C
Subdivision D
Subdivision E
Subdivision F
Subdivision G
Subdivision H
Subdivision I
Subdivision J
Subdivision K
Subdivision L

Demographics

See also
List of communities in Newfoundland and Labrador

References

External links
 

002